Night World is a series of nine young adult fantasy novels by American author L. J. Smith. In the series, vampires, witches, werewolves, and shape-shifters live among humans without their knowledge, making up a secret society known as the Night World. The society enforces two fundamental laws to prevent discovery: never allow humans to gain knowledge of the Night World's existence, and never fall in love with a human.

Each volume in the series follows a different teenage, female protagonist who must face challenges involving love, the "soulmate principle", and the Night World's strict code. In the first six novels, the plot focuses on the protagonist discovering her soulmate and the danger which ensues. In the seventh book of the series, the concept of an impending millennial apocalypse is introduced. The later books' plots focus on the search for four "Wild Powers" who, according to an ancient prophecy, will either save the world or aid in its destruction. Books from the series appeared on the New York Times Bestseller List for children's books in 2008 and 2009.

Publishing history
The first nine books in the Night World series were originally published in 1996–1998 by Simon & Schuster. The release of the tenth and final book, Strange Fate, was put on hold when L.J. Smith took a hiatus from writing in 1999. In 2008, the nine Night World books were reprinted in three omnibus volumes. For the 2008 reprint, some edits were made in an attempt at modernisation, such as the replacement of the word "Walkman" with "iPod" in Daughters of Darkness. These edits were not made consistently: there are references to iPods on one page of a novel, followed by references to the previously used "Walkman" on the next page.

Series summary

Each novel in the series includes two characters that discover that they are soulmates—beings connected by an unbreakable bond of love. Literature scholar Deborah Wilson Overstreet describes the soulmate principle as "the main story line in each novel".

Secret Vampire
Poppy North, a normal teenage girl, is diagnosed with terminal pancreatic cancer. Her best friend, James Rasmussen, secretly a vampire and her soulmate, rushes to find a cure. James decides to turn Poppy into a vampire in order to save her life. After Poppy is turned, James's cousin, Ash, abducts Poppy and takes her to Las Vegas. They attend a party held by the Lord of the Night World so that Ash can turn Poppy in for being an illegal vampire—James should not have turned her without permission or revealed to her the existence of the Night World. James manages to save her, and it is revealed that Poppy has every right to know about the Night World because she is actually a lost witch, one unaware of her magical heritage. James and Poppy set out to find Poppy's father, supposing he could help them.

Daughters of Darkness
Vampire sisters Rowan, Kestrel, and Jade Redfern escape from their homeland on a Night World island. They flee to Oregon to see their Aunt Opal. The girls discover their aunt has been killed and that their ruthless brother Ash has followed them to bring them home or kill them. Meanwhile, the sisters and Ash meet the Carters next door, and Ash, who hates humans, discovers that Mary-Lynette Carter, a human, is his soulmate. Although he is hesitant at first and they do not get along well, he cannot help his feelings and later proclaims his love for her. Jade begins dating Mary-Lynnette's brother, Mark, her soulmate. 

Mary-Lynnette's friend, Jeremy, reveals that he is a werewolf and tries to kill Ash, Kestrel, Jade, and Rowan for hunting in his territory. He also tries to turn Mary-Lynette into a werewolf, but she kills him using fire and a silver dagger. Ash leaves to cover up the events, and the sisters plan to stay in Oregon. Mary-Lynnette waits for Ash's return, thinking in the meantime about their love and whether she wants to turn into a vampire.

Spellbinder (also published under the title Enchantress)
Thea and Blaise Harman are witch cousins. Thea uses white magic and Blaise uses black magic. Blaise uses her charm and magic to make boys do anything for her, including cutting themselves with razors and burning down schools. When the cousins start attending a new school, Thea heals Eric Ross after he is bitten by a snake. Thea and Eric realize they are soulmates. 

Blaise is jealous that Eric has chosen Thea and is worried that Thea is breaking Night World law to be with Eric. In a desperate attempt to protect Eric from Blaise, Thea accidentally releases an angry spirit that kills one of Blaise's admirers. Thea and Eric try their best to capture the angry spirit by luring it away from the school. But Thea is wanted by the Circle because she is not allowed to use that kind of magic. Thea tells them that Eric is in trouble, because the angry spirit is with him. She gets to Eric before he is killed and puts the spirit back where it came from. The Circle tells her that she cannot love a human, so she chooses to drink the Cup of Lethe, a drink that erases a part of your memory, to erase her and Eric's knowledge of the Night World. However, Blaise had switched the drink with iced tea, so neither forgets that the Night World exists.

Dark Angel
After a near-death experience, Gillian Lennox is brought back to life by a being who calls himself "Angel". He helps her change her life, making her the most popular girl at school and uniting her with her long-time crush and soulmate, David Blackburn. Everything is perfect until Angel starts making strange requests, people start getting hurt, and Gillian learns about her heritage. She is a descendant of one of the lost Harman babies, meaning she is a witch. She learns that Angel is a spirit with unfinished business named Gary Fargeon, and that he is her cousin, a descendant of another lost Harman baby. His unfinished business is that he accidentally killed a girl when she disturbed a spell he was casting. Gillian helps him cross over.

The Chosen
At five years old, Rashel Jordan witnesses the murder of her mother and her young brother, Timmy, by a ruthless vampire. She becomes a vampire hunter known as The Cat, dedicating her life to killing vampires until she finds her mother's killer. She meets John Quinn, a cold-hearted vampire who turns out to be her soulmate. After investigating a series of strange abductions in her area, she infiltrates a vampire enclave, rescues the abductees, and plans to kill any vampires she can. Quinn saves Rashel from a werewolf and thus declares his love for her and attempts to turn her into a vampire to marry her. Later, they discover that Hunter Redfern is behind the vampire activity in the area including the killing of death of Rashel's mother. Rashel finds out that Timmy was not killed but was turned into a vampire at the age of four and raised by Hunter. Rashel's friend Nyala, a vengeful, unbalanced vampire hunter, sets the house on fire, but Quinn saves Rashel, Timmy, and Nyala. Rashel's anger and bitterness for all vampires dissolves, and she decides to stay with Quinn and join Circle Daybreak.

Soulmate
Hannah Snow has been having nightmares and keeps finding notes written in her own handwriting, warning her that she is in danger and will die before her seventeenth birthday. Worried about her sanity, she begins hypnosis with psychologist Paul Winfield. While hypnotized, she re-experiences her past lives and discovers that her soulmate is Thierry Descoudres, a vampire and a Lord of the Night World. Thierry and his enemy Maya find Hannah, and Hannah's life is at stake because Maya wants Thierry for herself. 

Hannah learns that Maya was a witch but wanted to be immortal, so she turned herself into a vampire by using a spell and drinking the blood of four babies. Maya went on to turn Thierry into a vampire, the first ever made vampire. At first, Hannah thinks that Thierry was the one who killed her in her past lives, but it was actually Maya in her shapeshifted form, disguised as Thierry. Hannah goes to Thierry's house and meets the other members of Circle Daybreak, a group of humans, vampires, wolves, witches, and shapeshifters who are hoping for peace between Night World and the human race. May captures Hannah and attempts to turn her into a vampire, kill her, and end her cycle of reincarnation. Instead, Hannah manages to kill Maya. Hannah decides to remain human and live a mortal life, after which Thierry will wait for her to return again.

Huntress
Jezabel "Jez" Redfern thinks she is a full vampire, but she soon finds out she is half-human. She runs away from her gang and her Uncle Bracken to live with her human relatives. She only goes back to the vampires when Circle Daybreak asks her to go on a dangerous mission: to fight her worst enemy, best friend, and soulmate, Morgead Blackthorn, over control of the Wild Power. The Wild Powers are four prophesied beings with the ability to use blue fire.

It turns out that the person thought to be the Wild Power is a fake. Jez, her friend Hugh, and her annoying cousin Claire are attacked by two werewolves and a vampire. When she and Claire fall off the station platform onto the train tracks, Jez sees blue fire and thinks Claire is the one. When she, Claire, Hugh, and Morgead are captured by Lily Redfern, who is in search of the Wild Power, Jez figures out the meaning of the prophecy: she is one of the Wild Powers, and her blood must be spilled to release the blue fire. Lily stabs Morgead with a stake, and Morgead convinces Jez not to let go or give up. Jez admits Morgead is her soul mate, and Morgead survives.

Black Dawn
Maggie is a human who tries to rescue her brother from his girlfriend, a witch named Sylvia. Maggie stumbles upon an old Night World colony, where she meets vampire prince Delos Redfern, ruler of the Night World and one of the Wild Powers. Though he is cold toward her, he repeatedly saves her, each time stating that he will not help her again. The two soon learn that they are soulmates, though Delos refuses it and tells her to leave. Maggie does not, and sheremains in the Night World to find her brother. 

Delos's great-grandfather, Hunter Redfern, arrives to take over the kingdom. Delos soon discovers that his powers are bound by a spell, and he cannot fight. Maggie finds out that her brother was turned into a shapeshifting falcon by Sylvia. Sylvia is killed by Hunter Redfern after she releases the spell binding Delos's powers. Hunter Redfern is presumably killed by Delos's use of blue fire. Maggie is happy to have found her brother and her soulmate. However, no one can rest yet, because the witches have seceded from the Night World Council, leading to war between vampires and witches. Two Wild Powers have been found, and both are now on the side of Circle Daybreak. Only two more remain.

Witchlight

Circle of Daybreak shapeshifter Raksha Keller and her team race to a mall to save the new Wild Power, Iliana Harman. Iliana is destined to marry Galen Drache, a shapeshifter of the first house, so the shapeshifters will side with the witches and not the vampires. But when Raksha learns that Galen is her soulmate, she realizes that their love could destroy the world. 

Night World shapeshifters have been attacking humans, and they have also killed the Crone of the witches, Grandma Harman. Iliana's deaf friend, Jaime, is hosting a party, to be held on the same night as the ceremony that bonds the witches and shapeshifters. Iliana tries to use her powers to save Jaime when a car is going to hit her, but she can not activate the power. Based on that failure, Iliana assumes that she is not the Wild Power but agrees to pretend that she is the Wild Power so the ceremony can still go ahead. However, she says that she will only help if she can go to Jaime's party. Raksha and the people who are protecting Iliana agree and go with her to keep her safe from the Night World shapeshifters, particularly a dragon that can disguise itself as anyone it touches.

The night before the party, Raksha and Galen stay up looking through scrolls that contain writing only shapeshifters can read, trying to learn about the dragon. They find out that dragons have horns and that if you cut them all off, they can no longer shapeshift. They also find out accidentally that they are soulmates, but Raksha thinks they have to ignore it because he has to marry Iliana. 

At the party, the dragon disguises itself as Jaime's brother Brett, lures Raksha into a room, and locks her in. She shapeshifts into a panther, jumps out the window, and reenters the party to try to find Iliana. The real Brett directs her to the basement, where Raksha finds a tunnel that leads her to her friends and Iliana, who is badly hurt. Raksha attacks the dragon, who was disguised as Jaime, and removes three out of the five horns. Galen who has never acquired a shape yet and wanted to be something small and peaceful turns into a leopard and removes another horn to save Raksha. Raksha sees her witch friend whisper something to Iliana, and Iliana stands up. She chants a spell and makes blue fire appear, which destroys the dragon while healing everyone else. Raksha and Galen find a way to be together and still unite the witches and shapeshifters: they need to do a blood cross between Iliana and Raksha.

Notes

References
An interview with L.J. Smith. Bookalicious.
Smith, L.J. Trying to catch up. Ye Olde Blog by L.J.
Smith, L.J. Latest news. L.J. Smith's Amazon Blog.
Smith, L.J. (1996). Daughters of Darkness. New York: Archway. .
Smith, L.J. (1996). Enchantress. Hodder Children's Books. .
Smith, L.J. (1996). The Chosen. Hodder Children's Books. .
Smith, L.J. (1997). Black Dawn. Hodder Children's Books. .
Smith, L.J. (1998). Witchlight. New York: Archway. .
http://www.ljanesmith.net/www/author/burning-fan-questions (22 January 2012)

External links
L.J. Smith's Official Website.
Night World Information Collective This site contains information about the books, characters, and concepts of the Night World series.
Night World Official Website
Review of all Night World published books
Fanlisting for the Night World series.

Novel series
Works by L. J. Smith (author)